Kurt Hansen (born 2 August 1951) is a former Denmark international footballer. He played seven times for Denmark between 1976 and 1978, scoring one goal. Hansen also played for the B 1901 and Nakskov BK clubs.

References

1951 births
Living people
Danish men's footballers
Denmark international footballers
Association football forwards